William M. H. Beck (January 3, 1900 – March 5, 1965) was an American football and baseball coach. He served as the head coach of the Rhode Island Rams football team in 1941 and then again from 1946 through 1949, compiling a record of 12–22–2. Beck also coached the Rhode Island baseball program from 1954 to 1959, tallying a mark of 40–56–1. In 1966, the school honored Beck by naming its newly constructed baseball stadium Bill Beck Field.

Beck died on March 5, 1965, at Mary Fletcher Hospital in Burlington, Vermont, after sustaining injuries in a skiing accident.

Head coaching record

Football

Baseball

References

External links
 

1900 births
1965 deaths
Rhode Island Rams baseball coaches
Rhode Island Rams football coaches
Providence College alumni
Sportspeople from Everett, Massachusetts